Longing for... is the sixth Mandarin studio album of Taiwanese Mandopop artist Rainie Yang. It was released on 29 July 2011 by Sony Music Taiwan with two covers: Blue Sky Edition and Starry Night Edition.

The album features an insert song "我們都傻" (Love Fool) of Taiwanese drama Love You starring Yang and Joseph Chang, who also featured in the music video of this song.

Track listing
 "仰望" (Longing for...)
 "我們都傻" (We Are All Silly) - insert song of Love You
 "缺陷美" (Imperfect Love)
 "Lovelution"
 "快轉" (Fast Forward)
 "結痂" (A Beautiful Scar)
 "轉彎" (Making a Difference)
 "幸福預兆" (Happiness)
 "曬焦的一雙耳朵" (The Summer in Spain)
 "一個人的 Happy Ending" (Happy Ending)

Music videos
 "我們都傻" (Love Fool) MV - feat Joseph Chang
 "仰望" (Longing for...) MV
 "缺陷美" (Imperfect Love) MV
 "曬焦的一雙耳朵" (The Summer in Spain) MV

References

External links 
 Rainie Yang@Sony Music Taiwan 
 Rainie Yang discography@Sony Music Taiwan 

2011 albums
Rainie Yang albums
Sony Music Taiwan albums